Moel Druman is a mountain in Snowdonia, North Wales and forms part of the Moelwynion. It is a subsidiary summit of Allt-fawr.

References

External links
 www.geograph.co.uk : photos of Moel Druman and surrounding area

Dolwyddelan
Ffestiniog
Mountains and hills of Conwy County Borough
Mountains and hills of Gwynedd
Mountains and hills of Snowdonia
Hewitts of Wales
Nuttalls